Qiyaməddinli (also, Kiyamadinli and Kiyamadynly) is a village and municipality in the Aghjabadi Rayon of Azerbaijan.

References 

Populated places in Aghjabadi District